Andrei Safonov (born 6 June 1964) is a politician from Transnistria. He lives in Bender, Transnistria's second largest city.

Biography 

Safonov ran for president against incumbent president Igor Smirnov in the election held on December 10, 2006, and came third with 3.9% of the vote.

He is a former teacher of literature and a former member of the parliament of the MSSR (Moldovan Soviet Socialist Republic), within the USSR. After Transnistria's declaration of independence, September 2, 1990, he founded the official news agency Olvia Press. He was subsequently appointed Minister of Education, Science and Culture, a post he held until 1999 when he formed an opposition movement to Igor Smirnov and an opposition newspaper, founded in 2000, called Novaia Gazeta.

References

External links
Novaia Gazeta (in Russian)
Tiraspol Times: "Outspoken Smirnov-critic Safonov launches presidential bid" (in English)

1964 births
Living people
Moldovan journalists
Male journalists
Transnistrian politicians
Moldovan MPs 1990–1994